Senator Tucker may refer to:

Eugene A. Tucker (1856–1942), Nebraska State Senate
Gregory Tucker (born 1957), West Virginia State Senate
John Randolph Tucker (judge) (1854–1926), Virginia State Senate
Larry Tucker (1935–2016), West Virginia State Senate
Susan Tucker (politician) (fl. 1980s–2010s), Massachusetts State Senate
Tommy Tucker (politician) (born 1950), North Carolina State Senate